Eve Ai Yi-liang (born 24 March 1987) is a Taiwanese singer-songwriter. She was crowned the winner of Super Idol 5 in 2010.

In 2017, she won Best Mandarin Female Singer at the 28th Golden Melody Awards.

Discography

Studio albums
If You Luv Me (2012)
Grown Love (2014)
Talk About Eve (2016)
Fade to Exist (2018)
How Come I Still Remember All (2021)

Singles

Writing credits
This list shows her works for other artists.

Awards and nominations

Association of Music Workers in Taiwan

Chinese Music Media Awards

Golden Melody Awards

HITO Music Awards

Spotify (Taiwan)

Super Idol 5

References

External links
Eve Ai's Facebook Page
Eve Ai's Instagram Page
Eve Ai's Weibo Page
Eve Ai's YouTube Channel

1988 births
Living people
Taiwanese women singer-songwriters
National Taiwan University of Arts alumni
21st-century Taiwanese women singers